Bengt Edvard Sixten "Sigge" Sparre af Rossvik (September 27, 1854 – July 19, 1889) was a Swedish nobleman, lieutenant, cavalry officer, journalist, poet, mostly known for the murder of circus performer Elvira Madigan in a murder-suicide act. Their story has since been subject to several theatrical and cinematic productions, such as that Elvira Madigan of Bo Widerberg in 1967 (played by Thommy Berggren) and a Danish film (Søren Svejstrup).

Early life 
Sparre af Rossvik was born on 27 September 1854 in Malmö, Sweden, the son of Sigge Rossvik and Adelaide Peijron.

Personal life 
In 1880, he married Countess Luitgard "Lycka" Adlercreutz.

Sparre and Madigan were both buried at Tåsinge graveyard.

References

Citations

Bibliography

External links 
Sparre's collection of poems

1854 births

1889 deaths
Swedish military personnel who committed suicide
Suicides by firearm in Denmark
Swedish nobility
19th-century Swedish journalists
19th-century Swedish poets
19th-century Swedish military personnel
Writers from Malmö
Sixten
Murder–suicides in Europe
1880s suicides